Hooker Creek is a stream in the U.S. state of California. The stream flows for  before it empties into Cottonwood Creek.

Hooker Creek has the name of J. M. Hooker, a pioneer settler.

References

Rivers of California
Rivers of Tehama County, California